The Patriarch of the Church of the East (also known as  Patriarch of Babylon, Patriarch of the East, the Catholicos-Patriarch of the East or the Grand Metropolitan of the East) is the patriarch, or leader and head bishop (sometimes referred to as Catholicos or universal leader) of the Church of the East. The position dates to the early centuries of Christianity within the Sassanid Empire, and the church has been known by a variety of names, including the Church of the East, Nestorian Church, the Persian Church, the Sassanid Church, or East Syrian. In the 16th and 17th century the Church, by now restricted to its original Assyrian homeland in Upper Mesopotamia, experienced a series of splits, resulting in a series of competing patriarchs and lineages. Today, the three principal churches that emerged from these splits, the Assyrian Church of the East, Ancient Church of the East and the Chaldean Catholic Church, each have their own patriarch – the Patriarch of the Assyrian Church of the East, the Patriarch of the Ancient Church of the East and the Patriarch of Baghdad of the Chaldeans, respectively.

List of patriarchs until the schism of 1552 

According to Church legend, the Apostleship of Edessa (Chaldea) is alleged to have been founded by Shimun Keepa (Saint Peter) (33–64), Thoma Shlikha, (Saint Thomas), Tulmay (St. Bartholomew the Apostle) and of course Mar Addai (St. Thaddeus) of the Seventy disciples. Saint Thaddeus was martyred c.66 AD.

Early bishops 
1.  Mar Thoma Shliha (c.34-50)
2.  Mar Addai Shliha (c.50-66) 
3.  Mar Aggai (c.66–81). First successor to the Apostleship of his spiritual director the Apostle Mar Addai, one of the Seventy disciples. He in turn was the spiritual director of Mar Mari.
4.  Palut of Edessa (c.81–87) renamed Mar Mari (c.87 – c.121) Second successor to the Apostleship of Mar Addai of the Seventy disciples. During his days a bishopric was formally established at Seleucia-Ctesiphon.
5. Abris (Abres or Ahrasius) (121–148 AD) Judah Kyriakos relocates Jerusalem Church to Edessa in 136 AD. Reputedly a relative of Joseph.
6. Abraham (Abraham I of Kashker) (148–171 AD) Reputedly a relative of James the Just son of Joseph.
7. Yaqob I (Mar Yacob I) (c. 172–190 AD) son of his predecessor Abraham and therefore a relative of Joseph.
8. Ebid M’shikha (191–203)
9. Ahadabui (Ahha d'Aboui) (204–220 AD) First bishop of the East to get status as Catholic. Ordained in 231 AD in Jerusalem
10. Shahaloopa of Kashker (Shahlufa) (220–266 AD)
Bar Aggai (267–c. 280)

Bishops of Seleucia-Ctesiphon 
Around 280, visiting bishops consecrated Papa bar Aggai as Bishop of Seleucia-Ctesiphon, thereby establishing the succession. With him, heads of the church took the title Catholicos.

11. Papa bar Aggai (c. 280–316 AD died 336)
12. Shemon bar Sabbae (Simeon Barsabae) (coadjutor 317–336, Catholicos from 337–341 AD)
13. Shahdost (Shalidoste)  (341–343 AD)
14. Barbashmin (Barbashmin) (343–346 AD). The apostolic see of Edessa is completely abandoned in 345 AD due to persecutions against the Church of the East.
15. Tomarsa (Toumarsa) (346–370 AD)
16. Qayyoma (Qaioma) (371–399 AD)

Metropolitans of Seleucia-Ctesiphon 
Isaac was recognised as 'Grand Metropolitan' and Primate of the Church of the East at the Synod of Seleucia-Ctesiphon in 410. The acts of this Synod were later edited by the Patriarch Joseph (552–567) to grant him the title of Catholicos as well. This title for Patriarch Isaac in fact only came into use towards the end of the fifth century.

17. Isaac (399–410 AD)
18. Ahha (Ahhi) (410–414 AD)
19. Yahballaha I (Yab-Alaha I) (415–420 AD)
20. Mana (Maana) (420 AD)
21. Farbokht (Frabokht) (421 AD)

Catholicoi of Seleucia-Ctesiphon 
With Dadisho, the significant disagreement on the dates of the Catholicoi in the sources start to converge. In 424, under Mar Dadisho I, the Church of the East declared itself independent of all the Church of the West (Emperor Justinian's Pentarchy); thereafter, its Catholicoi began to use the additional title of Patriarch. During his reign, the Council of Ephesus in 431 denounced Nestorianism.

22. Dadishoʿ (Dadishu I) 421–456 AD)
23. Babowai (Babwahi) (457–484 AD)
24. Barsauma (484–485) opposed by
 Acacius (Aqaq-Acace) (485–496/8 AD)
25. Babai (497–503)
26. Shila (503–523)
27. Elishaʿ (524–537)
Narsai intrusus (524–537)
28. Paul (539)
29. Aba I (540–552)

In 544 the Synod of Mar Aba I adopted the ordinances of the Council of Chalcedon.

30. Joseph (552–556/567 AD)
31. Ezekiel (567–581)
32. Ishoʿyahb I (582–595)
33. Sabrishoʿ I (596–604)
34. Gregory (605–609)
vacant (609–628)
Babai the Great (coadjutor) 609–628; together with Abba (coadjutor) 609–628

From 628, the Maphrian also began to use the title Catholicos. See the List of Maphrians for details.

35. Ishoʿyahb II (628–645)
36. Maremmeh (646–649)
37. Ishoʿyahb III (649–659)
38. Giwargis I (661–680)
39. Yohannan I (680–683)
vacant (683–685)
40. Hnanishoʿ I (686–698)
Yohannan the Leper intrusus (691–693)
vacant (698–714)
41. Sliba-zkha (714–728)
vacant (728–731)
42. Pethion (731–740)
43. Aba II (741–751)
44. Surin (753)
45. Yaʿqob II (753–773)
46. Hnanishoʿ II (773–780)

In 775, the seat transferred from Seleucia-Ctesiphon to Baghdad, the recently established capital of the ʿAbbasid caliphs.

47. Timothy I (780–823)
48. Ishoʿ Bar Nun (823–828)
49. Giwargis II (828–831)
50. Sabrishoʿ II (831–835)
51. Abraham II (837–850)
vacant (850–853)
52. Theodosius (853–858)
vacant (858–860)
53. Sargis (860–872)
vacant (872–877)
54. Israel of Kashkar intrusus (877)
55. Enosh (877–884)
56. Yohannan II bar Narsai (884–891)
57. Yohannan III (893–899)
58. Yohannan IV Bar Abgar (900–905)
59. Abraham III (906–937)
60. Emmanuel I (937–960)
61. Israel (961)
62. ʿAbdishoʿ I (963–986)
63. Mari (987–999)
64. Yohannan V (1000–1011)
65. Yohannan VI bar Nazuk (1012–1016)
vacant (1016–1020)
66. Ishoʿyahb IV bar Ezekiel (1020–1025)
vacant (1025–1028)
67. Eliya I (1028–1049)
68. Yohannan VII bar Targal (1049–1057)
vacant (1057–1064)
69. Sabrishoʿ III (1064–1072)
70. ʿAbdishoʿ II ibn al-ʿArid (1074–1090)
71. Makkikha I (1092–1110)
72. Eliya II Bar Moqli (1111–1132)
73. Bar Sawma (1134–1136)
vacant (1136–1139)
74. ʿAbdishoʿ III Bar Moqli (1139–1148)
75. Ishoʿyahb V (1149–1176)
76. Eliya III (1176–1190)
77. Yahballaha II (1190–1222)
78. Sabrishoʿ IV Bar Qayyoma (1222–1224)
79. Sabrishoʿ V ibn al-Masihi (1226–1256)
80. Makkikha II (1257–1265)
81. Denha I (1265–1281)
82. Yahballaha III (1281–1317) The Patriarchal Seat transferred to Maragha
83. Timothy II (1318–c. 1332)
vacant (c. 1332–c. 1336)
84. Denha II (1336/7–1381/2)
85. Shemʿon II (c. 1385 – c. 1405) (dates uncertain)
86. Eliya IV (c. 1405 – c. 1425) (dates uncertain)
87 Shemʿon III (c. 1425 – c. 1450) (existence uncertain)
88. Shemʿon IV Basidi (c.1450 – 1497)
89. Shemʿon V (1497–1501)
90. Eliya V (1502–1503)
91. Shemʿon VI (1504–1538)
92. Shemʿon VII Ishoʿyahb (1539–1558)

Patriarchal lines from the schism of 1552 until 1830

By the Schism of 1552 the Church of the East was divided into many splinters but two main factions, of which one entered into full communion with the Catholic Church and the other remained independent. A split in the former line in 1681 resulted in a third faction.

1. Eliya line
Based in Alqosh.
93. Eliya VI (VII) (1558–1591)
94. Eliya VII (VIII) (1591–1617)
95. Eliya VIII (IX) Shemon (1617–1660)
96. Eliya IX (X) Yohannan Marogin (1660–1700)
97. Eliya X (XI) Marogin (1700–1722)
98. Eliya XI (XII) Denha (1722–1778)
99. Eliya XII (XIII) Ishoyahb (1778–1804)
In 1780, a group split from the Eliya line and elected:
100. Yohannan VIII Hormizd (1780–1838)
In 1830, following the death of the Amid patriarchal administrator Augustine Hindi, he was recognised by the Vatican as patriarch of Babylon of the Chaldeans and the Mosul and Amid patriarchates were united under his leadership.  This event marked the birth of the since unbroken patriarchal line of the Chaldean Catholic Church.

2. Shemon lineBased in Amid, Siirt, Urmia and Salmas; 93. Shemon VIII  Sulaqa (1553–1555) 
94. Abdisho IV Maron (1555–1570)
95. Shemon Yahballaha IV (1570–1580)
96. Shemon IX Dinkha (1580–1600)Shemon line reintroduced hereditary succession in 1600; not recognised by Rome; moved to Qochanis97. Shemon X Eliyah (1600–1638)
98. Shemon XI Eshuyow (1638–1656)
99. Shemon XII Yoalaha (1656–1662)Shemon line in Qochanis formally broke communion with Rome:100. Shemon XIII Dinkha (1662–1700)
101. Shemon XIV Shlemon (1700–1740)
102. Shemon XV Mikhail Mukhtas (1740–1780)
103. Shemon XVI Yohannan (1780–1820)
104. Shemon XVII Abraham (1820–1861)

3. Josephite lineBased in Amid, split from the Eliya line; 97. Joseph I (1681–1696)
98. Joseph II Sliba Maruf (1696–1713)
99. Joseph III Timothy Maroge (1713–1757)
100. Joseph IV Lazare Hindi (1757–1780)
 Joseph V Augustine Hindi (1780–1827)

The Eliya line (1) in Alqosh ended in 1804, having lost most of its followers to Yohannan VIII Hormizd, a member of the same family, who became a Catholic and in 1828, after the death of a rival candidate, a nephew of the last recognized patriarch of the Josephite line in Amid (3), was chosen as Catholic patriarch. Mosul then became the residence of the head of the Chaldean Catholic Church until the transfer to Baghdad in the mid-20th century. For subsequent Chaldean Catholic patriarchs, see List of Chaldean Catholic patriarchs of Baghdad.

The Shemon line (2) remained the only line not in communion with the Catholic Church. In 1976 it officially adopted the name "Assyrian Church of the East". For subsequent patriarchs in this line, see List of patriarchs of the Assyrian Church of the East.

 Numeration of the Eliya line patriarchs 
Since patriarchs of the Eliya line bore the same name ( / Elīyā'') without using any pontifical numbers, later researchers were faced with several challenges, while trying to implement long standing historiographical practice of individual numeration. First attempts were made by early researchers during the 18th and 19th century, but their numeration was later (1931) revised by Eugène Tisserant, who also believed that during the period from 1558 to 1591 there were two successive Eliya patriarchs, numbered as VI (1558-1576) and VII (1576-1591), and in accordance with that he also assigned numbers (VIII-XIII) to their successors. That numeration was accepted and maintained by several other scholars. In 1966 and 1969, the issue was reexamined by Albert Lampart and William Macomber, who concluded that in the period from 1558 to 1591 there was only one patriarch (Eliya VI), and in accordance with that appropriate numbers (VII-XII) were reassigned to his successors. In 1999, same conclusion was reached by Heleen Murre-van den Berg, who presented additional evidence in favor of the new numeration. Revised numeration was accepted in modern scholarly works, with one notable exception.

Tisserant′s numeration is still advocated by David Wilmshurst, who does acknowledge the existence of only one Eliya patriarch during the period from 1558 to 1591, but counts him as Eliya "VII" and his successors as "VIII" to "XIII", without having any existing patriarch designated as Eliya VI in his works, an anomaly noticed by other scholars, but left unexplained and uncorrected by Wilmshurst, even after the additional affirmation of proper numbering, by Samuel Burleson and Lucas van Rompay, in the "Gorgias Encyclopedic Dictionary of the Syriac Heritage" (2011).

See also 
 List of patriarchs of the Assyrian Church of the East
 List of Chaldean Catholic patriarchs of Baghdad
 Ancient Church of the East
 Catholicose of the East
 Patriarch of the East
 Patriarchal Province of Seleucia-Ctesiphon

References

Bibliography

External links
 Nestorian Patriarchs

 
 
Church of the East
Patriarchs of the Church of the East
East, church of
Turkey religion-related lists
Iran religion-related lists